Laag-Nieuwkoop is a hamlet in the Dutch municipality of Stichtse Vecht.

The hamlet was first mentioned in the 14th century Nieucoop, and means "the lower new part of a concession". Laag-Nieuwkoop is not a statistical entity, and the postal authorities have placed it under Vleuten. The hamlet does not have place name signs. In 1840, it was home to 89 people. Nowadays, it consists of about 25 houses.

References 

Former municipalities of Utrecht (province)
Stichtse Vecht